Milad Tonekabon Futsal Club ( was an Iranian futsal club based in Tonekabon.

History

Season-by-season 
The table below chronicles the achievements of the Club in various competitions.

Famous players 
  Javad Asghari Moghaddam
  Saeid Ahmadabbasi
  Sina Parkas
  Reza Moradkhani
  Moslem Rostamiha

References

External links 
 Official website

Futsal clubs in Iran